Gehlen may refer to:

People with the surname 
 Adolph Ferdinand Gehlen (1775–1815), German chemist
 Arnold Gehlen (1904–1976), German philosopher
 Bruno Gehlen (1871–1951), entomologist who described several species including Rhagastis meridionalis
 Kurt von Gehlen (1927–1995), German professor
 Reinhard Gehlen (1902–1979), German Nazi general, intelligence officer
 Gehlen Organization, founded by him
 Dennis Gehlen, aka "TaKe", German gamer
 Karl Gehlen, German engineer
 Walter Gehlen, German athlete
 Duda (footballer, born 1994), Brazilian footballer born Eduardo Haas Gehlen

Locations
 Gehlen House and Barn, historic buildings in St. Donatus, Iowa, United States
 Gehlen Catholic School, in LeMars, Iowa, United States

See also
 Galan (disambiguation)
 Galen (disambiguation)
 Galien (disambiguation)
 Gehlen (disambiguation)
 Gaylon, a given name